Qəçrəş (also, Kechresh) is a village and municipality in the Quba Rayon of Azerbaijan.  It has a population of 2,175.

References 

Populated places in Quba District (Azerbaijan)